Seyyed Mojtaba Mahfouzi is an Iranian Principlists representative of Abadan in the Islamic Consultative Assembly (Majles), who was elected as the second representative of Abadan people (at the 11th elections of Majles) after Seyyed Mohammad Molavi and before Jalil Mokhtar.

Seyyed Mojtaba Mahfouzi has been worked in Islamic Revolutionary Guard Corps, and has PhD degree in Arabic Literature. Among his political positions is: "a member of cultural-commission of the Parliament of Iran" and so on.

See also 
 Seyyed Mohammad Molavi
 Seyyed Karim Hosseini
 Seyyed Lefteh Ahmad Nejad
 Jalil Mokhtar
 Habib Aghajari

References

Members of the Islamic Consultative Assembly by term
Members of the 11th Islamic Consultative Assembly
People from Abadan, Iran
Living people
Year of birth missing (living people)